Justin ("Judo") Anlezark (born 14 August 1977 in Katherine, Northern Territory) is a male shot putter from Australia. His personal best throw is 20.96 metres, achieved in April 2003 in Brisbane.

Anlezark was the first Australian male to reach a World Championship Shot Put final in 2003, and his 4th-place finish remains the best ever performance by an Australian man in a throwing event at this level. He followed this up with a sixth-place finish at the 2004 Olympics, another best ever performance by an Australian in his event.

After the 2004 Olympics Anlezark had a few mediocre seasons, but after throwing 20.33 and 20.41 at the Loughborough International meet in 2008, selectors nominated Anlezark to the Australian Olympic Committee for selection in the team for the 2008 Summer Olympics. He joined Scott Martin making this the first Olympics since Melbourne in 1956 that Australia was represented by two male shotputters. Neither of them reached the final round.

Achievements

In 1996 he won the national title in the men's discus throw.

Notes

External links 
 
 
 

1977 births
Living people
Australian male discus throwers
Australian male shot putters
Athletes (track and field) at the 2000 Summer Olympics
Athletes (track and field) at the 2004 Summer Olympics
Athletes (track and field) at the 2008 Summer Olympics
Athletes (track and field) at the 1998 Commonwealth Games
Athletes (track and field) at the 2002 Commonwealth Games
Commonwealth Games gold medallists for Australia
Olympic athletes of Australia
World Athletics Championships athletes for Australia
Commonwealth Games medallists in athletics
Competitors at the 2001 Goodwill Games
Medallists at the 2002 Commonwealth Games